Technogym is a company selling equipment and digital technologies for fitness, sport and health based in Cesena, Italy. Technogym has been Official Supplier to eight Olympic Games including the Tokyo 2020 games. The company was founded in 1983 by Nerio Alessandri.

History
Entrepreneur Nerio Alessandri in the early 1980s began building the prototype of an exercise machine in the garage of his home in Cesena. He used a public telephone booth because he had no telephone at home, and got help from his brother Pierluigi Alessandri, from his then girlfriend and now wife Stefania, and from friends and neighbours who became his first collaborators. He left his job as a designer at a company in Cesena that manufactured automatic machines for packaging fruit, then rented a warehouse in Gambettola. In 1985 Technogym launched its first complete strength training line, and in 1986 it presented Unica, a home training multistation.
Then, in 1990, the company added its first cardiovascular training line. In 1992 Technogym defines its wellness concept as "a lifestyle based on regular physical activity, a balanced diet and a positive attitude", adding the slogan "The Wellness Company" to the company logo. The wellness concept is proposed as an alternative to the American concept of fitness. In 1996 the company introduced Wellness System, the first software to manage people's training programs at the gym.
In 2000 it launched the Selection line and in 2002 it launched Excite, the first cardiovascular training line with an integrated TV screen. The company has been an official supplier for numerous Olympic Games.

In 2012 MyWellness Cloud, the evolution of the Wellness System that allows users to access their own personalized workout program on Technogym connected equipment, wherever they are, in the gym, in hotels, in medical centres, at home or outdoors thanks to a dedicated app.

In July 2014 Technogym partnered with industrial designer Antonio Citterio to create a sleek line of home gym equipment. The Personal Line integrates tablet-style console called VISIOWEB that runs on an Android platform
In August 2014, the 2016 Summer Olympics in Rio, announced it was choosing Technogym as an exclusive supplier. On 29 September 2012, the new Technogym Village was officially inaugurated in Cesena, with the presence of the President of the Italian Republic Giorgio Napolitano, the ministers Corrado Passera, Piero Gnudi and Renato Balduzzi, and the former President of the United States Bill Clinton. The new headquarters was designed by architect Antonio Citterio.

In 2019 Technogym enhanced its focus on digital introducing Technogym Bike, its first indoor bike that offers indoor-cycling classes live and on-demand run by trainers from fitness studios around the world.

After selling 6.96% of the capital in April 2019, in February 2020 Alessandri's Wellness Holding sold almost 5% of Technogym in an accelerated placement, cashing in 114 million. Wellness thus drops to 39.8% of the capital of the Romagna giant, equal to 56.9% of the voting rights.

Partnerships

Olympics

Technogym has been appointed Official Supplier to the Tokyo 2020  Olympics for the eighth time, after Sydney 2000, Athens 2004, Turin, 2006, Beijing 2008, London 2012, Rio de Janeiro 2016 and Pyeongchang 2018.

Football

The football teams Juventus FC, Milan AC, Inter FC have chosen Technogym as a partner for the athletic preparation of their players, as well as the F1 teams Ferrari and McLaren.

Other sports

In the world of tennis, Technogym has been chosen as supplier by Rafael Nadal and Jannik Sinner. In basket by the teams Olimpia Milano and Virtus Bologna. In sailing Technogym is partner of Luna Rossa, and in golf it's Official Partner of PGA (Professional Golfers Association), the organization that manages the main professional golf tours in the United States

Design awards
Technogym has received many awards for the design of its products: 3 Compasso D’oro awards, 12 ADI awards, 12 Red Dot Design Awards, 3 International Design Excellence Awards, and 4 iF awards.

See also

List of Italian companies

References

Sporting goods manufacturers of Italy
Italian brands
Companies established in 1983
Italian companies established in 1983
Exercise equipment companies
Exercise-related trademarks